Louise Golbey is a British singer, songwriter, and musician.

Career
Louise is an established artist, musician and songwriter on the live music scene of London and beyond.

Born in London, Golbey grew up in a musical family. Her grandfather played classical violin. Her uncle plays piano and her mother sings. Brought up in Bournemouth, she moved back to her home city of London after university to pursue a music career.
She has released several EP’s, singles and an album and has been getting a lot of support from DJs on BBC 1 Xtra, 6 Music, Jazz FM, Mi Soul, Radio 2 and radio stations across Europe.  Louise was also November’s Caffe Nero Artist of The Month. Her 2015 album Novel features a track with UK Soul Legend Omar and Mo Pleasure (a musician who has worked with Michael Jackson, Earth Wind and Fire and Ray Charles).

She is currently writing with Grammy and Ivor Novello winning songwriter / producer Rob Davis, who co-wrote songs such as Kylie’s Can’t Get You Out of My Head, Fragma’s Toca’s Miracle and Groovejet by Spiller .

She also hosts The Songwriters Podcast, produced by Unedited (in association with PRS for Music and The Ivors Academy). Check out series 1 here:  uned.it/thesongwriterspodcast

She has released several EP's and singles independently (see discography) and her first album, Novel (2015) was mixed and mastered by Drew 'Beats' Horley and included special guests Omar and Morris Pleasure and featured one track produced by Grammy Awards winning producer Aamir Yaqub Rihanna 's Unapolgetic album.

Louise is the singer on the global advert for the Mercedes EQS - first Electric car which was played around the world on multiple channels and in cinemas across the world.

Louise's long awaited second album 'Renaissance' was released on March 25th 2022. It features the title track (which she released as a single in 2021) which contains a sample of Aswad 's Warrior Charge. The album also features a track with Guinness World Records winning Canadian rapper D.O. (rapper) as well as other collaborations with top producers and songwriters. Beyonce announced she was releasing her album Renaissance a few months later.

Gigs and tours
She has played at London venues such as Ronnie Scotts, the London Hippodrome, and The Jazz Café. She has performed in France (Musique Cordiale Festival, Provence) and Germany (Cascadas Bar in Hamburg), at the Glastonbury Festival via BBC Introducing, the Isle of Wight Festival, and the London Jazz Festival. She was the opening act for George Benson at Kenwood House Picnic Concert and supported the Stylistics on their UK tour.

She has worked on tracks with Example and Newham Generals and has shared the stage with Ed Sheeran, Jessie J, Anthony David, Roy Ayers, Katy B, Paloma Faith, Mr Hudson, Lianne La Havas, Omar, Alexander O'Neal, Heatwave (band) Kenny Thomas,  En Vogue, Dexter Wansel, Eric Benet and Evelyn "Champagne" King.

And in September 2019 she performed at The Electric Soul Festival in London's 02 Arena supporting Kool and The Gang, Brand New Heavies, Level 42 and Heather Small.

Her music video for "How It Is" (which she also recorded in French) was nominated in the UK Music Video Awards. She was chosen as Caffe Nero Artist of the Month following Jack Savoretti.

Her 2019 single 'Different' was co-written with a produced by Dan Dare (aka Slang).

Songwriting and podcast
Louise co-wrote and sang the theme tune for UK comedy series Sex, Lattes and Hideous Dates for Amazon Prime.

In 2020, as well as working on her second album with single release Scarlet Woman produced by Mafro W (guitarist for Ghetts and Shakka, she is currently writing with Rob Davis (grammy award winning co-writer of Can't Get You Out Of My Head for Kylie Minogue and writing toplines for Eurovision 2021.
Louise has also started a podcast called What You Didn't Know About... where she interviews some of the top UK songwriters about their songwriting process and meanings behind their most successful songs. So far she has interviewed Ivor Novello winning songwriter Michelle Escoffery (Truce), Omar, Fiona Bevan and Rob Davis.

Discography

References

External links
 Official site

English soul singers
Neo soul singers
English women singer-songwriters
Year of birth missing (living people)
Living people
Singers from London